Hexagrammidae, the greenlings, is a family of marine ray-finned fishes belonging to the suborder Cottoidei in the order Scorpaeniformes. These fishes are found in the North Pacific Ocean.

Taxonomy
Hexagrammidae was first proposed as a family in 1888 by the American ichthyologist David Starr Jordan. The 5th edition of Fishes of the World classifies this family as the only family in the monotypic superfamily Hexagrammoidea within the suborder Cottoidei of the diverse order Scorpaeniformes. Other workers have found that if the Scorpaeniformes, as delimited in Fishes of the World, is not included in the Perciformes it renders the Perciformes paraphyletic. These workers retain the Cottoidei as a suborder within the Perciformes while reclassifying Hexagrammoidea as the infraorder Hexagrammales. The family Zaniolepididae has been included within the Hexagrammidae, as the subfamilies Zaniolepidinae and Oxylebiinae, but Fishes of the World and Betancur et al classify these taxa as distinct from the Hexagrammidae. The palcing of these two families in their own monotypic superfamilies was originally proposed in 1994 by Gento Shinohara.

Subfamilies and genera
Hexagrammidae contains the following subfamilies and genera:

 Subfamily Ophiodontinae Jordan & Gilbert, 1883
 Genus Ophiodon Girard, 1854
 Subfamily Hexagramminae Jordan, 1888
 Genus Hexagrammos Tilesius, 1810
Subfamily Pleurogramminae Rutenberg, 1954
 Genus Pleurogrammus Gill, 1861

Characteristics
Hexagrammidae have cirrhi but do not have ridges or spines on their heads, They have between one and five lateral lines and may have cycloid or ctenoid scales. There is a single dorsal fin which is notched and contains between 16 and 28 spines and 11 and 30 soft rays. There is a single spine and 5 soft rays in the pelvic fin. The front nostril on each side of the snout is well developed but the rear nostril may be absent or if it is there it is merely a small pore. The anal fin may have upn to 3 spines, or there may be no spines, and 6 or 7 soft rays. There is no swimbladder.

Distribution and habitat
Hexagrammidae is endemic to the North Pacific Ocean where they are found in the subarctic and temperate regions, with a single species, the whitespotted greenling Hexagrammos stelleri, being found in the Arctic Ocean too.

Biology
Hexagrammidae greenlings are demersal fishes, except for the pelagic Pleurogrammus, and they feed on crustaceans, polychaetes, small fishes and fish eggs.

Utilization
Hexagrammidae greenlings are fished for, the coastal species are fished for using hook and line and spears and in the late 20th and early 21st centuries the kelp greenling (Hexagrammas decagrammus) has become a target of a commercial fishery, while historically the lingcod (O. elongatus) and the atka mackerels of the genus Pleurogrammus have been the most targeted species.

References

 
 

Cottoidei
 
Ray-finned fish families

Taxa named by David Starr Jordan